New Songs for Old Problems is the second extended play by Australian alternative-indie rock band Middle Kids. It was released in May 2019 and peaked at number 44 on the ARIA Charts.

Track listing

Charts

Release history

References

2019 EPs
Middle Kids EPs